Tales of Absolution & Obsoletion is the eighth studio album by South African gothic rock band The Awakening, released worldwide via Intervention Arts in June 2009.

Recording
The Awakening's eighth full-length studio album released June 2009, Tales is described as "a return to Zeen/Dark Romantics-era classic gothic rock."  The album represents the longest lapse between releases, a full three years having passed since the band's previous release, Razor Burn.  It was the first of the band's albums to be cross-continentally written and recorded, as the band has been based in the United States since late 2007 but recorded various tracks from Tales in both South Africa and the USA. It is also the first of the band's albums to include Rose Mortem on piano and keyboards.

Track listing
All songs written by Ashton Nyte.
"Ivory (part 1 and 2)" - 6.17
"Indian Summer Rain" - 4.29
"Upon the Water" - 4.24
"A Carnival of Souls" - 3.59
"Frozen" - 4.52
"Nothing Like The Rain" - 4.08
"Where the Shadow Goes" - 4.01
"Open" - 4.02
"Prayer for the Song" - 3.06
"Alone" - 3.29

References

The Awakening (band) albums
2009 albums